Drepanacra binocula, known as the Australian variable lacewing, is a species of brown lacewing in the family Hemerobiidae, found across Australia and New Zealand, including Lord Howe Island, Norfolk Island and the Kermadec Islands.

Description

Australian variable lacewings are typically found in colonies of the insects they prey on. It has been seen feeding on a variety of hosts, including Psyllidae, spruce aphids, pine aphids, whiteflies, Eriosoma lanigerum and Trioza vitreoradiata. Drepanacra binocula can be identified by the distinctive shape and brown colour of its wings.

The species has been established in New Zealand since at least 1930. Drepanacra binocula is host to a parasitic wasp, the Lacewing Parasitoid Wasp Anacharis zealandica.

References

Hemerobiiformia
Insects described in 1838
Taxa named by Edward Newman